James Serrano (born May 9, 1976) is an American former professional baseball pitcher. He bats and throws right-handed.

Career
In , Serrano had an ERA of 2.13 for the Single-A Jupiter Hammerheads in 44 games and was promoted to Double-A Harrisburg to start . He had a 4.20 ERA and stayed at Double-A in  until a promotion to Triple-A Ottawa after recording a 2.18 ERA.

On March 24, Serrano was traded to the New York Mets with Jason Bay for Lou Collier. He pitched for Triple-A Norfolk until the Kansas City Royals purchased his contract on July 5, . He made his major league debut for the Royals on August 7, appearing in 10 games that season, including 5 starts. Serrano became a free agent at the end of the season.

On November 18, 2004, Serrano signed with the Oakland Athletics, with whom he became a full-time starting pitcher. He was released after 16 starts for Triple-A Sacramento during which, he went 8–3, compiled a 3.91 ERA, and struck out 89 in 92 innings. On July 3, he signed with the Cincinnati Reds. In 12 starts for Triple-A Louisville, Serrano had a 3.75 ERA and became a free agent after the season.

On December 9, Serrano signed with the Boston Red Sox recording a 2.50 ERA for Triple-A Pawtucket, but was released in June. He signed with the Wyverns and finished the 2006 season with them.

On January 4, Serrano signed a one-year minor league contract with the Florida Marlins and spent most of the year with Double-A Carolina and only 4 games with Triple-A Albuquerque. After sitting out a year, Serrano played for the independent Southern Maryland Blue Crabs in 2009, his most recent professional season.

External links

Career statistics and player information from Korea Baseball Organization

1976 births
Living people
Albuquerque Isotopes players
American expatriate baseball players in Canada
American expatriate baseball players in South Korea
Baseball players from Colorado
Carolina Mudcats players
Harrisburg Senators players
Jupiter Hammerheads players
Kansas City Royals players
KBO League pitchers
Louisville Bats players
Major League Baseball pitchers
New Mexico Lobos baseball players
Norfolk Tides players
Omaha Royals players
Ottawa Lynx players
Pawtucket Red Sox players
Peoria Javelinas players
Sacramento River Cats players
SSG Landers players
Southern Maryland Blue Crabs players
Vermont Expos players
Cape Fear Crocs players
Naranjeros de Hermosillo players
American expatriate baseball players in Mexico
Wichita Wranglers players